Elizabeth Gawrie is politician, who is Deputy Prime Minister of the Jazira Region of the Autonomous Administration of North and East Syria. She was elected in 2014 and is a member of the Syriac Union Party. She serves under Akram Hesso, and her co-deputy is Hussein Taza Al Azam. 

Gawrie is a Syriac Christian.

References 

Year of birth missing (living people)
Living people
Syriac Christians
Syrian women in politics
Rojava politicians